The crested jayshrike or crested shrikejay (Platylophus galericulatus), formerly known as the crested jay (despite not being a true jay) is a species of bird found in Brunei, Indonesia, Malaysia, Myanmar, and Thailand. It is the only member of the genus Platylophus and the family Platylophidae.

Although traditionally placed in the family Corvidae, its taxonomy has been under contention since the 2000s, as phylogenetic analyses indicate that it is not a true corvid, but rather a basal member of the Corvoidea radiation. Some authorities have suggested that it may belong to the helmetshrikes. In 2019, eBird and the Clements Checklist renamed the species the crested shrikejay and placed it in its own family, the Platylophidae, which was undescribed at the time. In 2021, the family Platylophidae was officially described, and in 2022 the International Ornithological Congress reclassified the species into Platylophidae. However, the family name Lophocittidae, originally described as Lophocitteae in 1855 by Johann Jakob Kaup, may have referred to the crested shrikejay, and if so would take precedence over Platylophidae.

Its natural habitats are subtropical or tropical moist lowland forest and subtropical or tropical moist montane forest. 
It is threatened by habitat loss.

References

Cited texts
 

Passeri
Birds of Malesia
crested jayshrike
crested jayshrike
Taxonomy articles created by Polbot